Kirrberg may refer to:
 Kirrberg (Saar), a district of Homburg, Saarland, Germany
 Kirrberg, Bas-Rhin, a commune in the Bas-Rhin department in France